Cyanoform (tricyanomethane) is a cyanocarbon and derivative of methane with three cyano groups.  For many years, chemists have been unable to isolate this compound as a neat, free acid.  However, in September 2015, reports surfaced of a successful isolation.

Properties 
Dilute solutions of this acid, as well as its salts, have long been well known. Cyanoform ranks as one of the most acidic of the carbon acids with an estimated pKa of -5.1 in water and measured pKa of 5.1 in acetonitrile.  The reaction of sulfuric acid with sodium tricyanomethanide in water (a reaction first tried by H. Schmidtmann in 1896 with inconclusive results) is reported to result in the formation of the hydrate  or the formation of (Z)-3-amino-2-cyano-3-hydroxyacrylamide, depending on the precise conditions. The reaction of HCl gas with sodium tricyanomethanide dissolved in THF is reported to yield 1-chloro-1-amino-2,2-dicyanoethylene and its tautomer.

Isolation
In September 2015 cyanoform was successfully isolated by a team of scientists at Ludwig Maximilian University of Munich. The team discovered that cyanoform was stable at temperatures below –40° Celsius; previous beliefs were that cyanoform was stable at room temperature. The isolation confirmed that cyanoform is a colorless liquid.

References

Organic acids
Nitriles
Substances discovered in the 2010s